Kholmsky District is the name of several administrative and municipal districts in Russia
Kholmsky District, Novgorod Oblast, an administrative and municipal district of Novgorod Oblast
Kholmsky District, Sakhalin Oblast, an administrative district of Sakhalin Oblast

See also
Kholmsky (disambiguation)

References